Ullersmo Prison is a prison in Ullensaker, Akershus. It was opened in 1970. The prison was intended as a replacement for the Botsfengselet in Oslo. It is used for long term prisoners from the whole of Norway, and has room for 205 inmates. The prison contains a sick ward, mechanic and carpentry workshops as well as a school.

Governors
Knut Eigum (1989-1999) 
Ellen C. Bjercke (1999-2010)
Tom A. Enger (2010-2014)

References

External links 
Official website in Norwegian

Ullensaker
Prisons in Norway
1970 establishments in Norway
Organizations established in 1970